Dance India Dance (also called by the acronym DID; tagline: Dance Ka Asli ID D.I.D.) is an Indian Hindi-language dance competition reality television series that airs on Zee TV, created and produced by Essel Vision Productions. It premiered on 30 January 2009. Here the judges are called Masters and Mithun Chakraborty was called Grand Master (until season 6). Season 7 premiered with a different concept. This show is a remake of Bengali show Dance Bangla Dance which premiered on 2007. After 3 successful season of Dance Bangla Dance, Zee TV remade this show for all-over Indian participants. 

The show features a format where dancers from a variety of styles enter open auditions held in Indian metropolitan cities to showcase their unique style and talents and, if allowed to move forward, are then put through mega-audition rounds of auditions to test their ability to adapt to different styles. At the end of mega audition, the top 18 dancers are chosen as finalists who move on to compete in the competition's main phase where they will perform solo, duet and group dance numbers in a variety of styles in competition for the votes of the broadcast viewing audience which, combined with the input of a panel of judges, determine which dancers will advance to the next stage from week to week.

The show features a variety of Indian cultural and international dance styles ranging across a broad spectrum of classical, Contemporary, Bollywood, Hip-hop, Jazz, Kalaripayattu, Salsa, and Musical theatre styles, among others, with many sub-genres within these categories represented.  Competitors attempt to master these styles in an attempt to survive successive weeks of elimination and win a cash prize and often other awards, as well as the title of India's Best Dancer - CJ. The show is choreographed by Indian choreographers, such as Mudassar Khan, Marzi Pestonji, Tanuj Jaggi and Mini Pradhan. The show has won several television awards for Most Popular Dance Reality Show.

Format

Selection process 
The selection process can be further broken down into two distinct stages: the Open Auditions and the second phase referred to as the Mega Auditions.

The Open Auditions take place in 5–6 major Indian cities and are typically open to anyone aged 15–30 at the time of their audition. The cities in which auditions are held vary from season to season but some, such as New Delhi, Mumbai and Kolkata have featured in almost every season. During this stage, dancers perform a brief routine (typically individually) before three masters. The masters will then make an on-the-spot decision as to whether the dancer demonstrated enough ability.  If the dancer impressed the masters with his/her dancing abilities, masters will award a Hat called Taqdeer Ki Topi (Hat of Destiny), moving them instantly one step forward in the competition.

The second stage of the selection process, the Mega Auditions, is a several-day-long process in which the 100 hopefuls are tested for overall well-rounded dance, stamina, and their ability to perform under pressure. The dancers are put through a battery of rounds which test their ability to pick up various dance styles (typically some of the more well-represented genres that will later be prominent in the competition phase, such as Hip hop, Bollywood, Jazz, Bharat Natyam, Kathak, Mohiniyattam, Odissi and Contemporary). At the end of this process, only the top 36 competitors will be chosen. The top 36 are then again asked to give solo performances, after which 18 are chosen in the final auditions. Then, those top 18 get divided into 3 teams which are named according to the 3 masters of the show such as, Mudassar Ki Mandali, Marzi Ke Mastane and Mini Ke Masterblasters. Each team containing 6 dancers then competes in the show, learning new skills throughout the journey.

Judges 
Grand Master Mithun Chakraborty has been being the head judge of the series. When any contestant performs an extraordinary performance, Grand Master gives him/her a salute. It's called Grand Salute and it is the highest respect for any contestant here. Every season, 3 Indian choreographers (who are called Coaches) choreograph the contestants and judge them too with Grand Master. The first three seasons were judged by 3 regular judges Master Geeta Kapoor, Master Terence Lewis & Master Remo D'Souza with Grand Master. Then the judges were changed season by season from season 4. When any contestant performs a perfect act, the judges give him/her a special speech which is as respect for the contestant.

List of the judges:

Adaptations 
 Dance Bangla Dance (Zee Bangla)
 Dance Maharashtra Dance (Zee Marathi)
 Dance Karnataka Dance (Zee Kannada)
 Dance Kerala Dance (Zee Keralam)
 Dance Odisha Dance (Zee Sarthak)
 Dance Tamizha Dance (Zee Tamil)
 Dance Punjab Dance (Zee Punjabi)
 Dance India Dance Telugu (Zee Telugu)

Seasons

Season 1 

First season was started on 30 January 2009. This season was hosted by Jay Bhanushali and Saumya Tandon. The grand finale was aired on 30 May 2009 and winner was Salman Yusuff Khan.

Masters:
Remo D'Souza, his team was named Remo Ke Rangeelay.
Terence Lewis, his team was named Terence Ki Toli.
Geeta Kapoor, her team was named Geeta Ki Gang.

Top 18 Contestants:

Remo Ke Rangeelay:
Salman Yusuff Khan
Prince R. Gupta
Khushboo Purohit
Mangesh Mondal
Bhavana Purohit
Rakhee Sharma

Terence Ki Toli:
Alisha Singh
Jai Kumar Nair
Mayuresh Wadkar
Vrushali Chavan
Kiran Sutavne
Shubho Das

Geeta Ki Gang:

Siddhesh Pai
Sunita Gogoi
Paulson
Mandakini Jena
Nonie Sachdeva
Jigar Ghatge

Finalists:
Salman Yusuff Khan (from Remo Ke Rangeelay) was the winner.
Alisha Singh (from Terence Ki Toli) was 1st runner-up.
Siddhesh Pai (from Geeta Ki Gang) was 2nd runner-up.
Jai Kumar Nair (from Terence Ki Toli) was 3rd runner-up.

Season 2 

Second season was started on 18 December 2009. This season was also hosted by Jay Bhanushali and Saumya Tandon. The grand finale was aired on 23 April 2010 and winner was Shakti Mohan.

Masters:
Remo D'Souza, his team was named Remo Ke Rangeelay.
Terence Lewis, his team was named Terence Ki Toli.
Geeta Kapoor, her team was named Geeta Ki Gang.

Top 21 Contestants:

Remo Ke Rangeelay:
Punit Pathak
Bhavna Khanduja
Nikkitasha Marwaha
Shashank Dogra
Meenu Panchal
Naresh Mondal

Terence Ki Toli:
Shakti Mohan
Kunwar Amar
Kruti Mahesh
Parvez Rehmani
Vandana
Ameet
Jack Gill (Wildcard)

Geeta Ki Gang:
Dharmesh Yelande
Binny Sharma
Amrita Mitra (wildcard)
Kishore Aman
Tina Pradkar
Altaf
Shruti

Finalists:
Shakti Mohan (from Terence Ki Toli) was the winner.
Dharmesh Yelande (from Geeta Ki Gang) was 1st runner-up.
Punit Pathak (from Remo Ke Rangeelay) was 2nd runner-up.
Binny Sharma (from Geeta Ki Gang) was 3rd runner-up.

Season 3 

Third season was started on 24 December 2011. This season was also hosted by Jay Bhanushali and Saumya Tandon. The grand finale was aired on 21 April 2012 and winner was Rajasmita Kar.

Masters:
Remo D'Souza, his team was named Remo Ke Rangeelay.
Terence Lewis, his team was named Terence Ki Toli.
Geeta Kapoor, her team was named Geeta Ki Gang.

Top 18 Contestants:

Remo Ke Rangeelay:
Sanam Johar
Mohena Singh
Vaibhav Ghuge
Lipsa Acharya 
Hardik Raval
Manju Sharma

Terence Ki Toli:
Pradeep Gurung
Raghav Juyal (wildcard) 
Neerav Balvecha (wildcard) 
Sneha Gupta
Piyali Saha
Varoon Kumar 
Sneha Kapoor
Chotu Lohar

Geeta Ki Gang:
Rajasmita Kar
Abheek Banerjee 
Paul Marshal
Urvashi Gandhi
Riddhika Singh 
Shafeer

Finalists:
Rajasmita Kar (from Geeta Ki Gang) was the winner.
Pradeep Gurung (from Terence Ki Toli) was 1st runner-up.
Raghav Juyal (from Terence Ki Toli) was 2nd runner-up.
Sanam Johar (from Remo Ke Rangeelay) was 3rd runner-up.
Mohena Singh (from Remo Ke Rangeelay) was 4th runner-up.

Season 4 

Fourth season was started on 26 October 2013. This season was hosted by Jay Bhanushali and Ishita Sharma. The grand finale was aired on 22 February 2014 and winner was Shyam Yadav from Mudassar ki Mandli.

Masters:
Mudassar Khan, his team was named Mudassar Ki Mandali.
Shruti Merchant, her team was named Shruti Ke Shandar.
Feroz Khan, his team was named Feroz Ki Fauj.
Karan Dhar, his team was named Karan Ke Kekde.

Top 11 Contestants:

Mudassar Ki Mandali:
Shyam Yadav
Swarali Karulkar
Dhiraj Bakshi

Shruti Ke Shandar:
Manan Sachdeva
Sumedh Mudgalkar
Shrishti Jain
Suniketa Bore

Feroz Ki Fauj:
Biki Das
Arundhati Garnaik
Ashutosh Pawar
Sapna Suryawanshi

Finalists:
Shyam Yadav (from Mudassar Ki Mandali) was the winner.
Manan Sachdeva (from Shruti Ke Shandar) was 1st runner-up.
Biki Das (from Firoz Ki Fauj) was 2nd runner-up.
Sumedh Mudgalkar (from Shruti Ke Shandar) was 3rd runner-up.

Season 5 

Fifth season was started on 27 June 2015. This season was hosted by Jay Bhanushali. The grand finale was aired on 10 October 2015 and winner was Proneeta Swargiary.

Masters:
Mudassar Khan, his team was named Mudassar Ki Mandali.
Punit Pathak, his team was named Punit Ke Panthers.
Gaiti Siddiqui, her team was named Gaiti Ke Gangsters.

Top 11 Contestants:

Mudassar Ki Mandali:
Kaushik Mandal
Saddam Hussain Sheikh
Anuradha Iyengar
Vicky Alhat

Punit Ke Panthers:
Proneeta Swargiary
Ashish Vashistha
Sally Sheikh
Pankaj Thapa

Gaiti Ke Gangsters:
Nirmal Tamang
Sahil Adanaya
Anila Rajan

Finalists:
Proneeta Swargiary (from Punit Ke Panthers) was the winner.
Nirmal Tamang (from Gaiti Ke Gangsters) was 1st runner-up.
Sahil Adanaya (from Gaiti Ke Gangsters) was 2nd runner-up.
Kaushik Mandal (from Mudassar Ki Mandali) was 3rd runner-up.
Ashish Vashistha (from Punit Ke Panthers) was 4th runner-up.

Season 6 

Sixth season is being aired from 4 November 2017. This season is being hosted by Amruta Khanvilkar and Sahil Khattar.

Masters:
Mudassar Khan, his team is named Mudassar Ki Mandali.
Marzi Pestonji, his team is named Marzi Ke Mastane.
Mini Pradhan, her team is named Mini Ke Masterblasters.

Top Contestants:

Mudassar Ki Mandali:
Shivam Wankhede 
Paramdeep Singh 
Alphons Chetty 
Daphisha Kharbani 
Ria Chatterjee 
Deepak

Marzi Ke Mastane:
Sachin Sharma
Kalpita Kachroo 
Punyakar Upadhyay 
Shweta Warrier 
Shweta Sharda
Rahul Burman

Mini Ke Masterblasters:
Sanket Gaonkar
Piyush Gurbhele 
Nainika Anasuru
Sujan Marpa
Deepak Hulsure (Wildcard Entry) 
Sonal Vichare 
Mitesh Roy 
Sarang Roy

Top 5 Finalists:
Sanket Gaonkar 
Piyush Gurbhele 
Nainika Anasuru (Wildcard Entry)
Sachin Sharma 
Shivam Wankhede
Sanket Gaonkar (from Mini Ke Masterblasters) is the winner

Sachin Sharma (from Marzi Ke Mastane) is the first runner up

Piyush Gurbhele (from Mini Ke Masterblasters) is the second runner up

Nainika Anasuru (from Mini Ke Masterblasters) is the third runner up

Shivam Wankhede (from Mudassar Ki Mandali) is fourth runner up

Season 7

Season 7 - "Battle Of The Champions" being aired from 22 June 2019. This season is being hosted by Karan Wahi.

Judges
Bosco Martis
Kareena Kapoor Khan
Raftaar

Zones Coaches
Paul Marshal (West Ke Singhams) 
Pranshu & Kuldeep (Lyrical) (2nd Runner-Up)Akshay Pal (Popping) (4th Runner-Up)Saakshi & Shambhavi (Freestyle) (Eliminated on 11 August 2019)Akash & Suraj (Freestyle) (Eliminated on 18 August 2018)Kings Squad (Hip-Hop) (Eliminated on 1 September 2019)Mansi Dhruv (Bollywood) (Eliminated on 22 September 2019)
Palden Lama Mawroh/Nirmal Tamang (East Ke Tigers) 
Mukul Gain (Contemporary) (3rd Runner-Up)Nrutya Naivedya (Odissi) (Eliminated on 7 July 2019)Pop & Flex (Popping) (Eliminated on 14 July 2019)M.D. Hasan (B-Boying) (Eliminated on 28 July 2019)Richika Sinha (Contemporary) (Eliminated on 8 September 2019)
Bhawna Khanduja (North Ke Nawabs)
Unreal Crew (Tuttmation - Tutting and Animation) (winner)Malka Praveen (Hip-Hop and Freestyle) (Eliminated on 21 July 2019)Hardik Rawat (Contemporary and Hip-Hop) (withdrew Due to Injury on 28 July 2019) N-House Crew (Freestyle) (Eliminated on 22 September 2019)
Sneha Kapoor (South Ke Thalaiwa)
I Am Hip-Hop (Hip-Hop) (runner-up)Ramya & Bhaskar (Freestyle) (Eliminated on 7 July 2019)Loyala Dream Team (Hip-Hop and Urban Choreography) (Eliminated on 14 July 2019)Anil & Tejas (Freestyle) (Eliminated on 21 July 2019)The Soul Queens (Bollywood and Hip-Hop) (Eliminated on 25 August 2019)

Li'l Masters

li'l Master season 1 
The first season of DID L'il Masters was judged by Farah Khan and Sandip Soparrkar. It was hosted by Manish Paul.

The four skippers were Jai (DID 1), Vrushali and Mayuresh (DID 1), Amrutha (DID 2), and Dharmesh (DID 2). Their teams were:

Dharmesh ke Dhinchak: Jeetumoni Kalita, Vaishnavi Patil, Ruturaj Mahalim, Khyati Patel

Jai ke Jhatang-Fatang: Vatsal Vithlani, Papiya Sarkar, Atul Banmoria, Divyam Viajyvergia

Vrushali aur Mayuresh ke Dhum-Dhadake: Manoj Rathod, Hansika Singh, Avneet Kaur, Neel Shah

Amritha ke Aflatoon: Anurag Sarmah, Khushabu Kargutkar, Shubham Maheshwari, Shivani Baranwal

Top 4 Finalists 
 Jeetumoni Kalita (winner) 
 Atul Banmoria (1st Runner Up) 
 Vaishnavi Patil (2nd Runner Up)
 Manoj Rathod (3rd Runner Up)

li'l Master season 2 
DID L'il Masters 2 was judged by Geeta Kapoor and Marzi Pestonji. It was hosted by Jay Bhanushali.

The four skippers were Prince (DID 1), Raghav (DID 3), Kruti (DID 2), Neerav (DID 3)

Prince ke Paltan: Faisal, Shalini, Deep, Shreya

Raghav ke Rockstars: Saummya, Rohan, Yash, Susanket

Kruti ke Kracters: Om, Uday, Rimsha, Jnana

Neerav ke Ninjas: Shreya, Tanay (WC), Jeet (WC), Rishi, Shivam

Top Finalists 
 Faisal Khan (winner) 
 Om Chetry (1st Runner Up) 
 Rohan Parkale (2nd Runner Up) 
 Saumya Rai (3rd Runner Up)

li'l Master season 3 
The third season began broadcasting on 1 March 2014. Geeta Kapoor, Ahmad Khan, and Mudassar Khan were judges, along with Sanam Johar (did3), Raghav Crockroaz Juyal(did3),(Lil M2)/ Omkar Shinde, Rahul Shetty and Paul Marshal Cardoz(did3) and Swarali Karulkar(did1), as skippers. The teams were Raghav/Omkar ke Rockstar, Sanam ke Superheroes, Rahul and Paul ke Rapchik Punters and Swarali ke Sparklers. Teriya Magar from Nepal was declared the winner, and Anushka Chetry became the 1st runner-up. Sadhwin Shetty was the 2nd runner-up. Hardik Ruparel was declared the 3rd runner-up

li'l Master season 4 
DID Li'l Masters returned with its 4th season after 4 years. It began broadcasting on 3 March 2018. Marzi Pestonji, Chitrangnda Singh and Siddharth Anand are the judges along with Vaishnavi Patil (li'l M1),(JDJ5),(JDJ6),(JDJ7),(JDJ8),(JDJ9),(DC1),(DD3) Jitumoni Kalita (li'l M1), Tanay Malhara (Li'l M2),(D+2,) and Bir Radha Sherpa (li'l M2),(D+3),(DC1) as the skippers. The teams are Vaishnavi Ke Veer, Jitumoni ke Janbaaz, Tanay ke Tigers and Bir ke Baahubali. Jiya Thakur from Vaishnavi ke Veer wins the title. Urva Bhavsar from Jitumoni ke Janbaaz is the first runner up followed by Tamman Gamnu from Bir ke Baahubali. The season was hosted by Jay Bhanushali and Vighnesh Pande.

li'l Master season 5 
DID Li'l Masters returned with its 5th season. It began broadcasting on 12 March 2022 with Remo D'Souza, Sonali Bendre and Mouni Roy as the judges with Jay Bhanushali as the host. The skippers for the season are Paul Marshal (DID3),(DID7),(Li'l M2),(SD1),(SD2),(SD3),(SD4),(IBD1),(IBD2), Vartika Jha (DD1),(D+4),(IBD1), (SD4), (IBD2) and Vaibhav Ghuge (DID3),(SD1),(SD2),(SD3),(SD4),(IBD1),(IBD2)

Contestant Status

Guest
Jackie Shroff,
Shahid Kapoor,
Aruna Irani,
Tiger Shroff,
Akshay Kumar,
Kartik Aryan,
Ranveer Singh,
Geeta Kapoor,
Terence Lewis,
Dharmesh Sir,
Salman Yusuff khan,
Shilpa Shetty,
Bosco Martis,
Varun Dhawan,
Anil Kapoor,
Kiara Advani,
Maneish Paul,
Ajay Devgn
Rakul Preet Singh
Bharti Singh for finale episode

Dancing with the stars
Dipali with adheshry, 
Rupesh,
Sumya with sadia,
Rupesh bane,
Rohan,
Sanket,
Pankaj thapa,
Rutuja,
Shayam yadav,
Sadwi

Dance India Dance L'il Masters North America Edition
Auditions were conducted in April 2014 with over 10,000 contestants auditioning from all across the US, Canada and Europe. Out of them 10 contestants were chosen and were flown to Mumbai, India to compete in the finals. The winner was Akhil and the second winner was Avantika Vandanapu.

Doubles 
The shows consisted of 12 finalist couples. The Grand Finale was scheduled for filming 7 April 2011 at the Andheri Sports Complex for broadcast on 9 April 2011. Amit and Falon were voted the winners of the season.

Super Moms

Super Moms Season 1 
The first season started on 1 June 2013, where, Mithu Chowdhury from Kolkata was declared the winner of Dance India Dance Super Moms 2013 Season, and Cecille Rodrigues from Goa was the 1st runner-up, and Shraddha Shah Raj from Surat was the 2nd runner-up. Skiper raguv (DID3), (Lil M1), (Li'l M2), skiper jay (DID1),
Farah khan and master marzi judge  Shows Photography Coverage by Ashvin Borad Surat, The Biggest finale in Gujarat, India.

Super Moms Season 2 
The second season started on 28 March 2015.
Harpreet Khatri who hails from Mumbai was announced the winner of Dance India Dance Super Moms Season 2 in 2015. Season 2 was anchored by popular TV actor Karan Wahi. Skiper sanam johar (DID3), skiper sidesh (DID2),skiper mayuresh (DID1). Season 2 was judged by Geeta Kapoor, Govinda, and Terence Lewis.

Super Moms Season 3 

Season 3 will be judged by Remo D'Souza, Bhagyashree & Urmila Matondkar and hosted by Jay Bhanushali.It started on 2 July 2022. This season was won Varsha Bumra and her choreographer Vartika Jha.

Special shows

Dance Ke Superstars 
Dance Ke Superstars featured contestants from the first two seasons to compete against each other. The show was judged by choreographers Remo D'Souza and Shiamak Davar, and featured a guest judge every week. Team Jalwa, the Season 2 DID contestants, won the series.

Dance Ke Superkids 
Dance ke Superkids- Battle of the Baaps! featured contestants from the first two seasons of DID L'iL Masters. It was judged by Geeta Kapoor, Farah Khan and Marzi Pestonji and hosted by Jay Bhanushali and Shreya Acharya. Team Yahoo, also known as DID L'il Masters Season 2, was led by Captain Raghav Juyal and choreographers: Kruti Mahesh and Prince Gupta. They won the competition with Faisal Khan, Soumya Rai, Rohan Parkale, Om Chetri, Jeet Das, Shalini Moitra and Tanay Malhara dancing their way to victory. Team Wakao, also known as DID L'il Masters Season 1, was led by Captain Dharmesh Yelande and choreographers: Mayuresh Vadkar and Vrushali Chavan; with dancing contestants: Jeetumoni Kalita, Vatsal Vithlani, Ruturaj Mahalim, Vaishnavi Patil, Atul Banmoria, Anurag Sarmah and Khyati Patel. The team fell just short of victory but thoroughly celebrated their time on the show all the same.

Dance Ka Tashan 
DID Dance Ka Tashan  featured contestants from Dance India Dance Super Moms competing against contestants from Dance India Dance L'il Masters 2. The show aired in November 2013 and was judged by choreographer Ahmed Khan and Geeta Kapoor and hosted by TV actor Rithvik Dhanjani and India's Best Dramebaaz, Nihar. The show was won by Team Todu, the DID L'il Masters Season 2 contestants, Faisal, Soumya, Rohan, Om, Shalini, Deep, Tanay, Jeet and Shreya.

Notes

References

External links 
 ZEE TV Official Channel
 
 Dance India Dance Streaming on ZEE5

Dance India Dance
2009 Indian television series debuts
Zee TV original programming
Frames Production series
Indian reality television series